A felon is someone who commits a felony.

Felon may also refer to:
 Felon (film), a 2008 drama film starring Val Kilmer
 Whitlow, an infection at the end of the finger
 Felon, Territoire de Belfort, a commune of the Franche-Comté region, in France
 Felon, NATO reporting name for the Sukhoi Su-57 jet fighter